In most computer programming languages, a while loop is a control flow statement that allows code to be executed repeatedly based on a given Boolean condition. The while loop can be thought of as a repeating if statement.

Overview
The while construct consists of a block of code and a condition/expression. The condition/expression is evaluated, and if the condition/expression is true, the code within all of their following in the block is executed. This repeats until the condition/expression becomes false. Because the while loop checks the condition/expression before the block is executed, the control structure is often also known as a pre-test loop. Compare this with the do while loop, which tests the condition/expression after the loop has executed.

For example, in the C programming language (as well as Java, C#, Objective-C, and C++, which use the same syntax in this case), the code fragment

int x = 0;

while (x < 5) {
    printf ("x = %d\n", x);
    x++;
}

first checks whether x is less than 5, which it is, so then the {loop body} is entered, where the printf function is run and x is incremented by 1. After completing all the statements in the loop body, the condition, (x < 5), is checked again, and the loop is executed again, this process repeating until the variable x has the value 5.

Note that it is possible, and in some cases desirable, for the condition to always evaluate to true, creating an infinite loop. When such a loop is created intentionally, there is usually another control structure (such as a break statement) that controls termination of the loop.
For example:

while (true) {
    // do complicated stuff
    if (someCondition)
        break;
    // more stuff
}

Demonstrating while loops
These while loops will calculate the factorial of the number 5:

ActionScript 3
var counter: int = 5;
var factorial: int = 1;

while (counter > 1) {
    factorial *= counter;
    counter--;
}

Printf("Factorial = %d", factorial);

Ada

with Ada.Integer_Text_IO;

procedure Factorial is
    Counter   : Integer := 5;
    Factorial : Integer := 1;
begin
    while Counter > 0 loop
        Factorial := Factorial * Counter;
        Counter   := Counter - 1;
    end loop;

    Ada.Integer_Text_IO.Put (Factorial);
end Factorial;

APL
counter ← 5
factorial ← 1

:While counter > 0
    factorial ×← counter
    counter -← 1    
:EndWhile

⎕ ← factorial

AutoHotkey
counter := 5
factorial := 1

While counter > 0
    factorial *= counter--    

MsgBox % factorial

Microsoft Small Basic
counter = 5    ' Counter = 5
factorial = 1  ' initial value of variable "factorial"

While counter > 0
    factorial = factorial * counter
    counter = counter - 1
    TextWindow.WriteLine(counter)
EndWhile

Visual Basic
Dim counter As Integer = 5    ' init variable and set value
Dim factorial As Integer = 1  ' initialize factorial variable

Do While counter > 0
    factorial = factorial * counter
    counter = counter - 1
Loop     ' program goes here, until counter = 0

'Debug.Print factorial         ' Console.WriteLine(factorial) in Visual Basic .NET

Bourne (Unix) shell
counter=5
factorial=1
while [ $counter -gt 0 ]; do
    factorial=$((factorial * counter))
    counter=$((counter - 1))
done

echo $factorial

C or C++
int main() {
    int count = 5;
    int factorial = 1;

    while (count > 1)
        factorial *= count--;

    printf("%d", factorial);
}

CFML

Script syntax
counter = 5;
factorial = 1;
 
while (counter > 1) {
    factorial *= counter--;
}

writeOutput(factorial);

Tag syntax
<cfset counter = 5>
<cfset factorial = 1>
<cfloop condition="counter GT 1">
    <cfset factorial *= counter-->
</cfloop>
<cfoutput>#factorial#</cfoutput>

Fortran
program FactorialProg
    integer :: counter = 5
    integer :: factorial = 1

    do while (counter > 0)
        factorial = factorial * counter
        counter = counter - 1
    end do

    print *, factorial
end program FactorialProg

Go
Go does not have a while statement, but it has the function of a for statement if you omit some elements of the for statement.

counter, factorial := 5, 1

for counter > 1 {
	counter, factorial = counter-1, factorial*counter
}

Java, C#, D
The code for the loop is the same for Java, C# and D:

int counter = 5;
int factorial = 1;

while (counter > 1)
    factorial *= counter--;

JavaScript
let counter = 5;
let factorial = 1;

while (counter > 1)
    factorial *= counter--;

console.log(factorial);

Lua
counter = 5
factorial = 1

while counter > 0 do
  factorial = factorial * counter
  counter = counter - 1
end

print(factorial)

MATLAB & GNU Octave
counter = 5;
factorial = 1;

while (counter > 0)
    factorial = factorial * counter;      %Multiply
    counter = counter - 1;                %Decrement
end

factorial

Mathematica
Block[{counter=5,factorial=1},  (*localize counter and factorial*)
    While[counter>0,            (*While loop*)
        factorial*=counter;     (*Multiply*)
        counter--;              (*Decrement*)
    ];

    factorial
]

Oberon, Oberon-2 (programming language), Oberon-07, or Component Pascal
MODULE Factorial;
IMPORT Out;
VAR
    Counter, Factorial: INTEGER;
BEGIN
    Counter := 5;
    Factorial := 1;

    WHILE Counter > 0 DO
        Factorial := Factorial * Counter;
        DEC(Counter)
    END;
    
    Out.Int(Factorial,0)
END Factorial.

Maya Embedded Language
int $counter = 5;
int $factorial = 1;

int $multiplication;

while ($counter > 0) {
    $multiplication = $factorial * $counter;

    $counter -= 1;
    
    print("Counter is: " + $counter + ", multiplication is: " + $multiplication + "\n");
}

Nim

var
  counter = 5            # Set counter value to 5
  factorial = 1          # Set factorial value to 1

while counter > 0:       # While counter is greater than 0
    factorial *= counter # Set new value of factorial to counter.
    dec counter          # Set the counter to counter - 1.

echo factorial

Non-terminating while loop:

while true:
  echo "Help! I'm stuck in a loop!"

Pascal
Pascal has two forms of the while loop, while and repeat. While repeats one statement (unless enclosed in a begin-end block) as long as the condition is true. The repeat statement repetitively executes a block of one or more statements through an until statement and continues repeating unless the condition is false. The main difference between the two is the while loop may execute zero times if the condition is initially false, the repeat-until loop always executes at least once.

program Factorial1;
var
    Fv: integer;

    procedure fact(counter:integer);
    var
        Factorial: integer;

    begin       
         Factorial := 1;
    
         while Counter > 0 do
         begin
             Factorial := Factorial * Counter;
             Counter := Counter - 1
         end;

         WriteLn(Factorial)
     end;

begin
    Write('Enter a number to return its factorial: ');
    readln(fv);
    repeat
         fact(fv);
         Write('Enter another number to return its factorial (or 0 to quit): '); 
     until fv=0;
end.

Perl
my $counter   = 5;
my $factorial = 1;

while ($counter > 0) {
    $factorial *= $counter--; # Multiply, then decrement
}

print $factorial;

While loops are frequently used for reading data line by line (as defined by the $/ line separator) from open filehandles:

open IN, "<test.txt";

while (<IN>) {
    print;
}

close IN;

PHP
$counter = 5;
$factorial = 1;

while ($counter > 0) {
    $factorial *= $counter--; // Multiply, then decrement.
}

echo $factorial;

PL/I
declare counter   fixed initial(5);
declare factorial fixed initial(1);

do while(counter > 0)
    factorial = factorial * counter;
    counter = counter - 1;
end;

Python
counter = 5                           # Set the value to 5 
factorial = 1                         # Set the value to 1

while counter > 0:                    # While counter(5) is greater than 0  
    factorial *= counter              # Set new value of factorial to counter.
    counter -= 1                      # Set the counter to counter - 1.

print(factorial)                      # Print the value of factorial.

Non-terminating while loop:

while True:
    print("Help! I'm stuck in a loop!")

Racket
In Racket, as in other Scheme implementations, a named-let is a popular way to implement loops:
#lang racket
(define counter 5)
(define factorial 1)
(let loop
    (when (> counter 0)
        (set! factorial (* factorial counter))
        (set! counter (sub1 counter))
        (loop)))
(displayln factorial)
Using a macro system, implementing a while loop is a trivial exercise (commonly used to introduce macros):
#lang racket
(define-syntax-rule (while test body ...) ; implements a while loop
    (let loop (when test body ... (loop))))
(define counter 5)
(define factorial 1)
(while (> counter 0)
    (set! factorial (* factorial counter))
    (set! counter (sub1 counter)))
(displayln factorial)
But note that an imperative programming style is often discouraged in Racket (as in Scheme).

Ruby
# Calculate the factorial of 5
i = 1
factorial = 1

while i <= 5
  factorial *= i
  i += 1
end

puts factorial

Rust
fn main() {
    let mut counter = 5;
    let mut factorial = 1;

    while counter > 1 {
        factorial *= counter;
        counter -= 1;
    }

    println!("{}", factorial);
}

Smalltalk
Contrary to other languages, in Smalltalk a while loop is not a language construct but defined in the class BlockClosure as a method with one parameter, the body as a closure, using self as the condition.

Smalltalk also has a corresponding whileFalse: method.

| count factorial |
count := 5.
factorial := 1.
[count > 0] whileTrue: 
    [factorial := factorial * count.
    count := count - 1].
Transcript show: factorial

Swift 
var counter = 5                 // Set the initial counter value to 5 
var factorial = 1               // Set the initial factorial value to 1

while counter > 0 {             // While counter(5) is greater than 0  
    factorial *= counter        // Set new value of factorial to factorial x counter.
    counter -= 1                // Set the new value of counter to  counter - 1.
}

print(factorial)                // Print the value of factorial.

Tcl
set counter 5
set factorial 1

while {$counter > 0} {
    set factorial [expr $factorial * $counter] 
    incr counter -1 
}

puts $factorial

VEX
int counter = 5;
int factorial = 1;

while (counter > 1)
    factorial *= counter--;

printf("%d", factorial);

PowerShell
$counter = 5
$factorial = 1

while ($counter) {
    $factorial *= $counter--
}

$factorial

While programming language
The While programming language is a simple programming language constructed from assignments, sequential composition, conditionals and while statements, used in the theoretical analysis of imperative programming language semantics.
C := 5;
F := 1;

while (C > 1) do
    F := F * C;
    C := C - 1;

See also
 Do while loop
 For loop
 Foreach
 LOOP (programming language) – a programming language with the property that the functions it can compute are exactly the primitive recursive functions

References

Control flow
Articles with example Ada code
Articles with example C code
Articles with example Fortran code
Articles with example Pascal code
Articles with example Perl code
Articles with example Python (programming language) code
Articles with example Racket code
Articles with example Smalltalk code